Idun (Idũ), or Dũya (Dunya, Adong, Lungu, Ungu), is a poorly attested Plateau language of Nigeria. Its classification is uncertain, but it may be closest to Ashe.

Villages
Speakers live in Ramindop B, Ùndofã̀, Udou, Táymɛ̀̃, Adar, Igbà, Mɛ̀mdɔr, Hùrtɔ̀̃, Àgbàŋànɔr, Ùmbùmbàŋ, Jàja, Ǹdam, Kùkaŋ, Ùkare, Ùnwĩĩ, Igbayinɔr, Ìdɛ̀zìnì, and Ugɛrɛ villages of Kaduna State. Hausa village names are Shinkafa, Yèlwa, Jabe Panda, and Gunduma.

Phonology

Consonants 

1. Only in recent loanwords, mostly from Hausa

Vowels 

All vowels except the near-close vowels /ɪ/ and /ʊ/ can appear long, nasalised or both; the vowels /ɪ/ and /ʊ/ are being lost for young speakers.

Tone 
There are three level tones in Idun, as well as a rising tone and falling tone arising from adjacent level tones.

References

External links
Roger Blench: Idũ page

Central Plateau languages
Languages of Nigeria